Cevimeline (trade name Evoxac) is a synthetic analog of the natural alkaloid muscarine with a particular agonistic effect on M1 and M3 receptors. It is used in the treatment of dry mouth and Sjögren's syndrome.

Medical uses 
Cevimeline is used in the treatment of xerostomia (dry mouth), and Sjögren's syndrome. It increases the production of saliva.

Side effects 
Known side effects include nausea, vomiting, diarrhea, excessive sweating, rash, headache, runny nose, cough, drowsiness, hot flashes, blurred vision, and difficulty sleeping.

Contraindications include asthma and angle closure glaucoma.

Mechanism of action 
Cevimeline is a cholinergic agonist. It has a particular effect on M1 and M3 receptors. By activating the M3 receptors of the parasympathetic nervous system, cevimeline stimulates secretion by the salivary glands, thereby alleviating dry mouth.

See also 
 Pilocarpine — a similar parasympathomimetic medication for dry mouth (xerostomia)
 Bethanechol — a similar muscarinic parasympathomimetic with longer-lasting effect

References

External links 
 Evoxac (cevimeline HCl hydrate capsules) Full Prescribing Information

Muscarinic agonists
Oxathiolanes
Quinuclidines
Spiro compounds
Daiichi Sankyo